Galleon is a debut album by French house band Galleon. It was released in 2002. The album contains three singles, "So I Begin", "I Believe" and "One Sign".

Group members
Michel Fages
Phillippe Laurent
and 
Gilles Fahy

Track listing
"So I Begin" - 3:57
"Shining Light" - 3:55
"One Sign" - 3:36
"The Best World" - 4:25
"I Believe" - 3:57
"Da Rock" - 5:10
"Rhythm & Melody" - 2:14
"Each Day" - 4:22
"Money & Work" - 4:21
"The Way" - 5:18
"My Name" - 4:00
"Angel Wings" - 3:56
"Ghost Ship" - 6:57
"Freedom to Move (Levi's Theme)" - 3:57

Chart performance

References

External links
Galleon on Discogs

2002 debut albums